sibiricum is a species name, "of Siberia." Some genera associated with this name are:

Flora
 Agropyron sibiricum, a synonym for Agropyron fragile
 Apocynum sibiricum, Siberian Dogbane
 Diplazium sibiricum, a species of fern 
 Erythronium sibiricum, a bulbous perennial in the family Liliaceae
 Filifolium sibiricum, a flowering plant species
 Myriophyllum sibiricum, a species of water milfoil
 Polygonatum sibiricum, a plant of medicinal properties
 Veronicastrum sibiricum, a plant in the plantain family

Fauna
 Elasmotherium sibiricum, an extinct giant rhinoceros
 Filientomon sibiricum, a Proturan